Elaeoluma is a genus of plants in the family Sapotaceae described as a genus in 1891.

Elaeoluma is native to Central and South America.

Species
 Elaeoluma crispa T.D.Penn - Venezuela (Amazonas)
 Elaeoluma glabrescens (Mart. & Eichler) Aubrév. - Costa Rica, Panama, Colombia, Venezuela, Guyana, Peru, Bolivia, Brazil
 Elaeoluma nuda (Baehni) Aubrév. - Suriname, Venezuela, N Brazil
 Elaeoluma schomburgkiana (Miq.) Baill. - Guyana, S Venezuela, N Brazil

References

Chrysophylloideae
Sapotaceae genera
Taxa named by Henri Ernest Baillon